Abayab Nattyadal is a Bangladeshi Bengali theatre group. The group was founded on 4 April 1997. The theatre group has staged more than 20 plays. Their first play was Khun.

Productions 
(in alphabetical order)
 Bhimrati
 Bhumadhyasagar
 Khun

References 

Bengali theatre groups
Theatre companies in Bangladesh